Zotefoams Plc manufactures a range of closed cell crosslinked foams from polyolefins and engineering polymers for global use in sports, construction, marine, automation, medical equipment and aerospace. The headquarters are in Croydon, London, with additional foam manufacturing plants in Kentucky, USA and Brzeg, Poland. Steve Good is the current chairman, David Stirling is managing director, and Gary McGrath is finance director.

The company was spun off from BP Chemicals in 1992. It began in the 1920s producing block foam.

The company makes the majority of its sales from exports overseas with a number of registered trademarks.

A fire in early 2001 at the factory damaged 70% of Zotefoams' stock and disrupted some deliveries to customers. At this time, the company also exited the toy market. The same year, Zotefoams entered a worldwide sales and marketing alliance for polyolefin foams with the Sekisui Chemical Company Ltd ('Sekisui'), which acts as agent and distributor for Zotefoams in continental Europe, Asia and some customers in North America.

In November 2022, it was announced Zotefoams has acquired the Skanderborg-headquartered packaging material manufacturer, Refour ApS.

2020 results
Full year results show:

Sales: £82.7m
Profit before tax: £8.3m
Total dividend for the year 6.30p share

These compare with 2019 full year figures of:

Sales: £80.9m
Profit before tax: £9.8m
Total dividend for the year 2.03p

References

External links

London Borough of Croydon
Chemical companies based in London